Los Sueños (Dreams or Visions) is a satirical prose work by the Spanish Baroque writer Francisco de Quevedo. Written between 1605 and 1622, it was first published in Barcelona in 1627 under the title Sueños y discursos de verdades descubridoras de abusos, vicios y engaños en todos los oficios del mundo ("Dreams and discourses on truths revealing abuses, vices and deceptions in all the professions and estates of the world").

Los Sueños consists of five sections, each describing a satirical dream vision of the next world:
El Sueño del Juicio Final ("The Dream of the Last Judgement")
El Alguacil Endemoniado ("The Bedevilled Constable")
Sueño del Infierno ("The Vision of Hell")
El Mundo por de dentro ("The World from the Inside")
Sueño de la Muerte ("The Dream of Death")

References

Satirical books
1627 books
Spanish books
Spanish-language books